Abu al-Yusr al-Bazdawi (c.1030-c.1100), who was given the honorific title of Sadr al-Islam, was a prominent Central Asian Hanafi-Maturidi scholar and a qadi (judge) in Samarqand in the late eleventh century. He was a teacher to several well-known Hanafi scholars, such as Najm al-Din 'Umar al-Nasafi and 'Ala' al-Din al-Samarqandi (who was a teacher to Al-Kasani).

Name 
Abu al-Yusr Muhammad b. Muhammad b. al-Hussein b. 'Abd al-Karim b. Musa b. Mujahid al-Nasafi al-Bazdawi.

The attribution al-Bazdawi indicates that he or his family originated from Bazda or Bazdawa, a small town with a castle on the road between Nasaf and Bukhara.

He was the younger brother of Fakhr al-Islam Abu al-Hassan al-Bazdawi, the author of Kanz al-Wusul, also known as Usul al-Bazdawi.

Birth 
He was born around the year 421 A.H. (1030 A.D.) and received his earliest education in Maturidism disciplines from his father. His grandfather Abu Muhammad 'Abd al-Karim b. Musa al-Bazdawi (d. 390 AH/1000–1001 CE), who was a student of al-Maturidi, and his elder brother Fakhr al-Islam 'Ali b. Muhammad al-Bazdawi (d. 482–483 AH/1089–1090 CE) were leading Hanafi scholars and wrote many books.

Teachers 
 Shams al-A'imma 'Abd al-'Aziz al-Halwai (d. 456/1064) who was also a teacher to Al-Sarakhsi.

 Fakhr al-Islam al-Bazdawi (d. 482 AH) who was his elder brother.

Students 
Some of his well known students were Najm al-Din 'Umar al-Nasafi and 'Ala' al-Din al-Samarqandi (who was a teacher to 'Ala' al-Din al-Kasani).

Works 

He was the author of several works on law, including a commentary on the major work of Abu Hanifa, after whom the Hanafi school was named, and a commentary on a work of Abu Hanifa's student Muhammad al-Shaybani, who was one of the founders of the Hanafi school.

The most important of his books which remain is Kitab Usul al-Din (edited with a biographical introduction by Hans-Peter Linss).

Al-Bazdawi’s Kitab Usul al-Din, as described by Hans-Peter Linss, comprises:
 a short review of all literature of the heretics on dogma and theology in Islam;
 a Hanafi-Sunni orthodoxy defence against the dissenting opinions and teachings of the heretical sects; and
 a study on the heterodox factions in Islam, their subdivisions and their most important leaders.

Al-Bazdawi was also the author of Ma'rifat al-Hujaj al-Shar'iyya in Usul al-Fiqh. 

Dr. Haytham Abdul-Hamid Khazna said in his book Tatawur al-Fikr al-Usuli al-Hanafi that this book should not be attributed to Abu al-Yusr al-Bazdawi, because the books of Tarajim (biographies and bibliographies) didn't mention it, and because the book is weak in style analysis.

Death 
After serving for a period of time as a magistrate in Samarqand, he eventually moved to Bukhara and died there in 493 A.H. (1100 A.D.).

See also 
 Abu Hanifa
 Abu Mansur al-Maturidi
 Abu al-Mu'in al-Nasafi
 List of Hanafis
 List of Ash'aris and Maturidis
 List of Muslim theologians

References

External links
 Islamic Pedia - Abu al-Yusr al-Bazdawi
 Ebü’l-Yüsr el-Pezdevî 
 (Usul-üd-Din) Ebü’l-Yüsr el-Pezdevî’nin (ö. 493/1100) kelâma dair eseri 

Hanafis
Maturidis
11th-century Muslim theologians
Sunni imams
Sunni Muslim scholars of Islam
Hanafi fiqh scholars
Uzbekistani Muslims
1030s births
1100 deaths